Antonio Lining (born May 9, 1963, in Mindoro, Philippines) is a Filipino pool player, nicknamed "Nikoy".  He is one of the few left-handed Asian players.

Lining's most notable appearance was in the Motolite International Nine-ball Tournament in 2000, where he finished second to Francisco Bustamante, having beaten Efren Reyes in the quarter-finals.

At the 2002 Busan Asian Games, Lining and Bustamante won the gold medal at the nine-ball doubles event.

Between 1992 and 2017, Lining has played in one or more of the All Japan Championship (Nine Ball), U.S. Open Championship (Nine Ball) and the World Pool Championship (Nine Ball).

Achievements
 2015 Kanto 10-Ball Open
 2014 Japan Open 10-Ball
 2006 Japan Open 9-Ball
 2005 Brunswick Tokyo Open 
 2002 Asian Games Nine-ball doubles
 2001 Southeast Asian Games Nine-ball Singles
 2000 All Japan Championship 9-Ball
 1999 Muntinlupa 9-Ball Open
 1998 Hokuriku 9-Ball Open
 1998 Amagasaki 9-Ball Open
 1997 Davao 9-Ball Open
 1995 Davao 9-Ball Open 
 1994 Asian 9-Ball Championship
 1994 Indonesian 9-Ball Open 
 1993 JJ's Billiards 9-Ball Open
 1992 Tung Pa 9-Ball Open
 1992 Himeji 9-Ball Open 
 1989 Scratch 9-Ball Open

References

External links
Easypooltutor biography

Filipino pool players
People from Mindoro
Living people
1963 births
Asian Games medalists in cue sports
Cue sports players at the 2002 Asian Games
Asian Games gold medalists for the Philippines
Medalists at the 2002 Asian Games